The 2012–13 Hartford Hawks women's basketball team represented the University of Hartford during the 2012–13 NCAA Division I women's basketball season. Hartford was led by head coach Jennifer Rizzotti who was in her fourteenth season as head coach.

Roster

Schedule

|-
!colspan=9 style=| Non-conference regular season

|-
!colspan=9 style=| America East regular season

|-
!colspan=9 style=| America East Women's Tournament

|-
!colspan=9 style=| WNIT

References

Hartford
Hartford Hawks women's basketball seasons
Hartford Hawks
Hartford Hawks